The Chalk Butte Formation is a geologic formation in Oregon. It preserves fossils dating back to the Neogene period.

Fossil content 
The following fossils have been reported from the formation:

 Antecalomys valensis
 Basirepomys pliocenicus
 Copemys cf. esmeraldensis
 Cupidinimus magnus
 Diprionomys parvus
 Dipoides vallicula
 Eucyon davisi
 Goniodontomys disjunctus
 Hypolagus vetus
 Peromyscus antiquus
 Pliohippus spectans
 Plionictis oregonensis
 Scapanus proceridens
 Dipoides sp.
 Spermophilus sp.
 Camelidae indet.
 Perognathinae indet.
 Soricidae indet.
 ?Vespertilionidae indet.

See also 
 List of fossiliferous stratigraphic units in Oregon
 Paleontology in Oregon

References

Bibliography 
 

Neogene geology of Oregon
Miocene Series of North America
Messinian
Tortonian
Pliocene Series of North America
Hemphillian
Zanclean
Paleontology in Oregon
Formations